This is a list of notable alumni of Troy University, a public university located in Troy, Alabama, United States, and any of its former names (Troy State University, Troy State College, etc.). Alumni are in alphabetical order by their area of prominence.

Media

Jill Dobson, Fox News Channel entertainment correspondent; former Miss Michigan and Miss USA contestant
Tom Foreman, CNN political correspondent and host of This Week at War and This Week in Politics
Danielle Frye, pit road announcer for NASCAR radio affiliate Motor Racing Network
Lynne Koplitz, stand-up comedian and actress
Melanie Newman, play-by-play broadcaster for the Baltimore Orioles of Major League Baseball (MLB); first woman to be a play-by-play announcer for the Orioles and one of only four women play-by-play broadcasters active in MLB. 
Natalie Montgomery-Carroll, fitness professional and contestant on Big Brother 5 on CBS 
Adria Montgomery-Klein, fitness professional and contestant on Big Brother 5 on CBS 
James "J.T." Thomas, Jr., contestant and winner of Survivor: Tocantins on CBS 
Vecepia Towery, contestant and winner of Survivor: Marquesas on CBS 

Craig Pittman, award-winning author, former long-time columnist and writer for Tampa Bay Times.

Science, government, education and the arts

Bennie G. Adkins, U.S. Army command sergeant major; Medal of Honor recipient
Austin Badon, state representative for Orleans Parish, Louisiana since 2004; administrator at Nunez Community College in Chalmette since 2000 
John Michael Bednarek, Lieutenant General, United States Army
William Beidelman, Union Army Second Lieutenant, Second Mayor of Easton, Pennsylvania
Ray Boland, Secretary of the Wisconsin Department of Veterans Affairs
John Bott, artist; professor emeritus of Colby–Sawyer College
Bubba Scott, former executive director of the AHSAA; former football head coach at Samford University.
Bobby Bright, former mayor of Montgomery, Alabama and former congressman for Alabama's 2nd district
Hank Erwin, politician and Christian evangelist; Republican State Senator of Alabama, 2002–2010;   portrayed by Sean Astin in the movie Woodlawnyv
Delphine Feminear Thomas, class of 1910, educator, state official
Kevin A. Ford, NASA astronaut; pilot of the Space Shuttle Discovery during the August 2009 STS-128 mission; commander for the November 2012 Expedition 34 mission to the International Space Station (ISS).
James D. Halsell, NASA astronaut, flew multiple missions to the International Space Station (ISS).
Don Gaetz, member of the Florida Senate
William G. Gregory, former NASA astronaut and STS–67 pilot for the March 1995 mission of the Space Shuttle Endeavour
David G. Grimes, insurance agent in Montgomery and Republican member of the Alabama House of Representatives from District 73, 2003–2011
John C. Hanley, U.S. Army brigadier general
Gordon S. Holder, former Vice Admiral in the United States Navy; commander of the Military Sealift Command
Scott A. Howell, Commander of the military's Joint Special Operations Command (JSOC)

Manuel H. Johnson, former Federal Reserve Board of Governors, 1986–1990
Troy King, former attorney general for the state of Alabama
Kevin Kregel, NASA astronaut and mission commander for the February 2000 mission of the Space Shuttle Endeavour
James J. LeCleir, U.S. Air Force major general
Michael J. McCarthy, U.S. Air Force major general
John Perzel, politician and member of the Republican Party
James A. Roy, Chief Master Sergeant of the Air Force
Robert W. Smith, band composer and educator
Mimi Soltysik, 2016 Socialist Party USA presidential nominee
Kim Swan, politician; Leader of Her Majesty's Loyal Opposition in Bermuda and Party Leader of the United Bermuda Party
Zula Brown Toole, first woman to found and publish a newspaper in Georgia
Charles F. Wald, former Deputy Commander of United States European Command; four-star general
Cam Ward, Republican member of the Alabama Senate
Eric J. Wesley, Deputy Commanding General of United States Army Futures Command; three star general
Richard Brophy, U.S. Navy rear admiral, graduate of U.S. Navy Strike Fighter Weapons School (TOPGUN).
Peter F. Davey, U.S. Air Force colonel, Inspector General of the U.S. Air Education & Training Command, F-16 fighter command pilot, graduated Top Gun.
John Brunson, NASA Core Stage Office Exectutive; former space shuttle main engine manager.
Roy Eason, NASA technology report assessor, writer of NASA's Apollo Experience Report
Fred Iead, NASA aerospace technologist
David A. Wright, research pilot and manager in the Flight Operations Directorate at NASA; research pilot of two high-altitude ER-2 Earth resources aircraft.

Sports
Vincent Hancock, 3-time Olympic gold medalist in skeet shooting
Mario Addison, NFL player with the Carolina Panthers
Ben Bates, professional PGA golfer
Jonathan Carter, former NFL player
 Elaine Cheris (born 1946), Olympic fencer
Brannon Condren, former NFL safety with the Indianapolis Colts
Danny Cox, former MLB veteran of eleven years
DuJuan Harris, former NFL player
Fred Hatfield, former MLB infielder
Kerry Jenkins, former NFL offensive lineman for the Tampa Bay Buccaneers and Super Bowl XXXVII champion
Jerrel Jernigan, former NFL player
Robbie Laing, head men's basketball coach at Campbell University
Al Lucas, former NFL and Arena Football League lineman who died during a game while playing for the Los Angeles Avengers
Elbert Mack, NFL defensive back for the Tampa Bay Buccaneers
Alfred Malone, NFL defensive tackle for the Green Bay Packers on the practice squad
Bubba Marriott, American player of gridiron football
Sherrod Martin, former NFL player
Larry Mason, NFL running back for the Cleveland Browns and the Green Bay Packers
Leodis McKelvin, 11th overall pick in the 1st Round of the 2008 NFL Draft, first-team All-American football player and current cornerback for the Buffalo Bills
Steve McLendon, former NFL player
Derrick Moore, former NFL player and current chaplain for the Georgia Tech Yellow Jackets football team
Marcus Richardson, linebacker for the Houston Texans
Mike Rivera, catcher for MLB's Milwaukee Brewers
Windham Rotunda, professional wrestler known as Bray Wyatt in WWE
Mackey Sasser, former MLB catcher
Virgil Seay, former NFL wide receiver player and Super Bowl XVII champion
Willie Tullis, former NFL player
Lawrence Tynes, Scottish-American NFL place kicker for the Super Bowl XLII champion New York Giants
Osi Umenyiora, All-Pro NFL defensive end for the Super Bowl XLII champion New York Giants
Rod Walker, former NFL player who played defensive tackle for three seasons for the Green Bay Packers
DeMarcus Ware, All-Pro NFL linebacker for the Denver Broncos
Leonard Wheeler, former NFL player

References

Troy University alumni